MTV Music (formerly VIVA) was a Polish 24h music and entertainment channel from Viacom International Media Networks Polska. The channel was launched on June 10, 2000 by the German VIVA Media AG.

History
On July 17, 2012 VIVA Poland switched to 16:9 picture format and started to use the new logo. Since then VIVA has broadcast more reality programmes like Excused. Until July 17, 2012 the channel has broadcast FTA on Eutelsat Hot Bird 13A.

In 2014, the station cancelled local production programmes.

In 2015 - 2017, the station cancelled all reality programmes and continued playing only electronic dance music. Before the new broadcast schedule, the station was playing Polish and international pop, dance, rock and hip hop music.

On 17 October 2017, the channel was rebranded into MTV Music in 12:12.

The channel, along with VH1, closed on 3 March 2020, and replaced by MTV Music 24. The final music video played on the channel was "You Should Be Sad" by Halsey.

Programmes

VIVA Poland 
 100% Dance
 100% VIVA
 Chartsurfer
 Club Chart
 European Top 10
 Excused: Odpasasz (Excused)
 In & Out
 Kolejno odlicz, czyli VIVA 10 naj
 Mega Top 10
 Miłość na bogato (Rich Love)
 Miłość w rytmie kasy
 Net Charts
 Nieustraszeni (Fear Factor)
 Operacja: Stylówa
 Ostre gadki
 Piękna i kujon (Beauty and the Geek)
 PL Top 10
 Polska stówa
 Powerlista
 Randka się opłaca
 Ringtone Charts
 Spanie z gwiazdami
 Szał ciał
 Top 5 Best of VIVA
 Top 10
 Ty Wybierasz
 VIVA Dance
 VIVA Dance Mix
 VIVA Power Dance
 VIVA Pudelek
 VIVA Sounds
 VIVA Top 5
 VIVA Top 20
 VIVA Top 50
 Wojna gwiazd
 MTV Hits

MTV Music 
 MTV Nie mów do mnie rano
 MTV Hits
 MTV Dance
 MTV 100% Music
 MTV Music Non-stop
 MTV 3 z 1
 MTV Nowe
 Ikony MTV
 Moje MTV
 I love PL
 MTV Ty wybierasz
 MTV Polska lista
 MTV Top 10
 MTV Music PL Top 10
 MTV Club Chart Top 10
 MTV US Top 10
 MTV European Top 10
 MTV European Top 20
 MTV 24/7
 MTV Bites
 MTV Unplugged

Presenters

Former presenters

Logo

External links
 MTV Music Polska - presentation, screenshots

Defunct television channels in Poland
Television channels and stations established in 2000
2000 establishments in Poland
Television channels and stations disestablished in 2020
2020 disestablishments in Poland

pl:MTV Music Polska